Peter Arthur Wells (born 13 August 1956) is an English former footballer who played as a goalkeeper for Nottingham Forest, Southampton, Millwall and Orient in the 1970s and 1980s.

References

1956 births
Living people
Footballers from Nottingham
English footballers
Association football goalkeepers
English Football League players
Nottingham Forest F.C. players
Southampton F.C. players
Millwall F.C. players
Leyton Orient F.C. players
Fisher Athletic F.C. players